Anna Jurkiewicz (born 9 February 1984) is a Polish former competitive figure skater. She is a three-time (2007–2009) Polish national champion. She qualified to the free skate at four ISU Championships — 1998 Junior Worlds in Saint John, New Brunswick, Canada; 2007 Europeans in Warsaw, Poland; 2008 Europeans in Zagreb, Croatia; and 2009 Worlds in Los Angeles, California, United States;.

Jurkiewicz placed 5th at Junior Worlds in 1998 and the Junior Grand Prix Final in 1999. She became the first-ever Polish skater to qualify for the JGP Final. The next season she suffered a back injury. In the summer of 2004, she temporarily left skating. She returned in April 2006.

Programs

Competitive highlights
GP: Grand Prix; JGP: Junior Grand Prix

2002–03 to 2010–11

1995–96 to 2001–02

References

External links 

 
 Anna Jurkiewicz at Tracings.net
 Official homepage

1984 births
Living people
People from Oświęcim
Polish female single skaters
Figure skaters at the 2010 Winter Olympics
Olympic figure skaters of Poland
Sportspeople from Lesser Poland Voivodeship